Dolinsk-Sokol is a reserve military air base in Sakhalin Oblast, Russia located 8 km south of Dolinsk. It is a small base with numerous hardened hangars (aircraft shelters).

It existed before June 1966 according to declassified KH-7 satellite images. Its chief operating unit was 365 IAP (365th Interceptor Aviation Regiment), flying the Sukhoi Su-15, MiG-23, and Sukhoi Su-27 during its 40 years of tenure.  In the 1980s it received the MiG-31. It is also listed as being home to 361 IIVP (361st Instruction Test Helicopter Regiment) flying Mil Mi-24 and Mil Mi-8 helicopters.

In the early 1980s, Mikoyan-Gurevich MiG-21 Fishbed aircraft occasionally deployed from Dolinsk-Sokol to the front-line airfield of Burevestnik, 240 miles to the southeast on the Kuril Islands  In early 1983 Dolinsk-Sokol began deploying newer MiG-23 from Dolinsk-Sokol to Burevestnik after upgrades were completed there.

Dolinsk-Sokol is famous for being home to the Sukhoi Su-15 that shot down Korean Air Lines Flight 007 near Moneron Island in September 1983. At that time, base commander was General Anatoly Kornukov, who later become Commander of the Russian Air Force. At the time of the shootdown, Kornukov apparently ordered the shootdown to prevent KAL 007 from leaving Sakhalin airspace.

References

Russian Air Force bases
Soviet Air Force bases
Airports in Sakhalin Oblast